Arthur Simmonds (1 February 1848 – 2 August 1933) was an English first-class cricketer active 1871–73 who played for Surrey and Cambridge University. He was born in Godalming; died in Ascot.

References

1848 births
1933 deaths
English cricketers
Surrey cricketers
Cambridge University cricketers